The Communauté de communes Les Gués de l'Yerres is a former federation of municipalities (communauté de communes) in the Seine-et-Marne département and in the Île-de-France région of France. It was created in December 2004. In 2017 most of its communes became part of the new Communauté de communes de la Brie des Rivières et Châteaux.

Composition 
The Communauté de communes comprised the following communes:

Coubert
Courquetaine
Évry-Grégy-sur-Yerre
Grisy-Suisnes
Limoges-Fourches
Lissy
Ozouer-le-Voulgis
Soignolles-en-Brie
Solers

See also
Communes of the Seine-et-Marne department

References 

Former commune communities of Seine-et-Marne